Green Point is a south-eastern suburb of the Central Coast region of New South Wales, Australia between Erina and Kincumber accessed by a main road, Avoca Drive. It is part of the  local government area.

The suburb is served by the Kincumber shopping centre, with a Coles supermarket, butcher, grocer and other stores and a variety of restaurants. There is an Aldi supermarket at nearby Erina. Much of Green Point is adjacent to Brisbane Water, providing water views to many residents.

There is one private school, Green Point Christian College.

Heritage listings 
Green Point has a number of heritage-listed sites, including:
 9 Pixie Avenue: Green Point Foreshore and Structures
 9 Pixie Avenue: Mulholland's Farm

References

Suburbs of the Central Coast (New South Wales)
Central Coast Council (New South Wales)